Narrabri was an electoral district of the Legislative Assembly in the Australian state of New South Wales. It was created in 1894, largely replacing Namoi and including Narrabri. It was abolished in 1904, following the 1903 New South Wales referendum, which required the number of members of the Legislative Assembly to be reduced from 125 to 90. and was largely replaced by a recreated Namoi.

Members for Narrabri

Election results

References

Former electoral districts of New South Wales
1894 establishments in Australia
Constituencies established in 1894
1904 disestablishments in Australia
Constituencies disestablished in 1904